Poco Live is the tenth album, and second live album, by the American country rock band Poco.  The material for this album had been recorded for Epic Records shortly after the Cantamos album, but it was not released until over a year later, after Poco's switch to ABC Records and success with the Head over Heels album.  The release of this album (April 1976, Epic) produced confusion in the marketplace over whether this or Rose of Cimarron (May 1976, ABC Records) was Poco's newest album, helping sales of Poco Live and hurting sales of Rose of Cimarron.

Track listing
"Medley: Blue Water / Fools Gold / Rocky Mountain Breakdown" (Paul Cotton, Rusty Young) – 6:36
"Bad Weather" (Paul Cotton) – 3:50
"Ride the Country" (Paul Cotton) – 7:41
"Angel" (Paul Cotton) – 5:14
"High and Dry" (Rusty Young) – 4:35
"Restrain" (Timothy B. Schmit) – 5:13
"A Good Feelin' to Know" (Richie Furay) – 5:12

Personnel

Poco
Paul Cotton – guitar, vocals
Rusty Young – steel guitar, banjo, guitar, vocals
Timothy B. Schmit – bass guitar, guitar, vocals
George Grantham – drums, vocals

Others
Mark Henry Harman – keyboards
Producer: Poco, Mark Henry Harman
Recording Engineer: Mark Henry Harman

References

Poco live albums
1976 live albums
Epic Records live albums